Seeb Palace (also known by its native name Beit al-Baraka) is a royal palace in Seeb, near Muscat, Oman. It is an official residence of the Sultan of Oman. It also home to the Royal Oman Symphony Orchestra, established in 1985.

References

Seeb
Palaces in Oman